Anel Ahmedhodžić (born 26 March 1999) is a Bosnian professional footballer who plays as a centre-back for Championship club Sheffield United and the Bosnia and Herzegovina national team.

Ahmedhodžić started his professional career at Nottingham Forest, before joining Malmö FF in 2019. He was loaned to Hobro IK later that year and to Bordeaux in 2022. Later that year, he moved to Sheffield United.

Born in Sweden to Bosnian parents, he made his full international debut for Bosnia and Herzegovina in 2020, earning 18 caps since.

Club career

Early career
Ahmedhodžić started playing football at his hometown club Malmö FF, before joining youth academy of English team Nottingham Forest in January 2016. He made his professional debut against Newcastle United on 30 December at the age of 17.

Malmö FF
In January 2019, Ahmedhodžić returned to Malmö FF on a three-year deal. He made his official debut for the side against AIK on 30 June.

In July, he was sent on a season-long loan to Danish outfit Hobro IK, but was recalled in January 2020. On 21 July, he scored his first professional goal against Esbjerg.

In April 2020, Ahmedhodžić signed a new three-year contract with Malmö FF. On 5 August, he scored his first goal for the side in a triumph over Helsingborg. He won his first trophy with the club on 8 November, when they were crowned league champions.

On 14 September 2021, Ahmedhodžić debuted in UEFA Champions League against Juventus.

In January 2022, he was loaned to French outfit Bordeaux until the end of season.

Sheffield United
In July, Ahmedhodžić was transferred to Sheffield United for an undisclosed fee. He made his competitive debut for the team on 6 August against Millwall. On 17 August, he scored his first goal for Sheffield United in a victory over Sunderland.

International career
After representing Sweden at all youth levels, Ahmedhodžić made his senior international debut in a friendly game against Moldova on 9 January 2020. However, in August, he decided that he would play for Bosnia and Herzegovina in the future.

In September, his request to change sports citizenship from Swedish to Bosnian was approved by FIFA. Later that month, he received his first senior call-up, for UEFA Euro 2020 qualifying play-offs against Northern Ireland and 2020–21 UEFA Nations League games against the Netherlands and Poland. He debuted against Northern Ireland on 8 October.

On 12 October 2021, in a 2022 FIFA World Cup qualifier against Ukraine, Ahmedhodžić scored his first senior international goal.

Personal life
Ahmedhodžić married his long-time girlfriend Marijana Cecilija Mašić in July 2022.

Career statistics

Club

International

Scores and results list Bosnia and Herzegovina's goal tally first, score column indicates score after each Ahmedhodžić goal.

Honours
Malmö FF
Allsvenskan: 2020, 2021

Individual
Allsvenskan Defender of the Year: 2020
Allsvenskan Breakthrough of the Year: 2020

References

External links

1999 births
Living people
Footballers from Malmö
Swedish people of Bosnia and Herzegovina descent
Citizens of Bosnia and Herzegovina through descent
Swedish footballers
Sweden youth international footballers
Sweden under-21 international footballers
Sweden international footballers
Swedish expatriate footballers
Bosnia and Herzegovina footballers
Bosnia and Herzegovina international footballers
Bosnia and Herzegovina expatriate footballers
Dual internationalists (football)
Association football central defenders
Nottingham Forest F.C. players
Malmö FF players
Hobro IK players
FC Girondins de Bordeaux players
Sheffield United F.C. players
English Football League players
Allsvenskan players
Danish Superliga players
Ligue 1 players
Expatriate footballers in England
Expatriate men's footballers in Denmark
Expatriate footballers in France
Swedish expatriate sportspeople in England
Swedish expatriate sportspeople in Denmark
Swedish expatriate sportspeople in France
Bosnia and Herzegovina expatriate sportspeople in England
Bosnia and Herzegovina expatriate sportspeople in Sweden
Bosnia and Herzegovina expatriate sportspeople in Denmark
Bosnia and Herzegovina expatriate sportspeople in France